Christian Thonhofer (born May 26, 1985) is an Austrian football player currently playing for SC Neudörfl.

Honours
 Austrian Football Bundesliga winner: 2008.

References

External links
 rapidarchiv.at profile 
 Guardian football
 Christian Thonhofer at ÖFB

1983 births
Living people
Austrian footballers
Austrian Football Bundesliga players
Association football defenders
SK Rapid Wien players
SC Wiener Neustadt players
Wolfsberger AC players
FK Austria Wien players
FC Mauerwerk players
SK Austria Klagenfurt players